Don't Panic is the independently-released second mixtape by British hip hop collective Section Boyz. The mixtape debuted at #21 on the iTunes chart on pre-orders alone, and reached #3 on the day of the release. In the mixtape's first week it reached number 37 in the UK Albums Chart, later peaking at number 36.

Track listing

References 

2015 mixtape albums
Smoke Boys albums